Cuba has submitted films for consideration in the Academy Award for Best International Feature Film category at the Oscars since 1978. The award is handed out annually by the United States Academy of Motion Picture Arts and Sciences to a feature-length motion picture produced outside the United States that contains primarily non-English dialogue.

, Cuba has submitted twenty-two films. Cuba received their first and only Oscar nomination for their 1994 submission, Strawberry and Chocolate, a gay-themed comedy-drama.

The Cuban nominee is selected annually by the Cuban Film Institute, the Instituto Cubano del Arte e Industria Cinematográficos (ICAIC).

Submissions
Every year, each country is invited by the Academy of Motion Picture Arts and Sciences to submit its best film for the Academy Award for Best Foreign Language Film. The Foreign Language Film Award Committee oversees the process and reviews all the submitted films. Following this, they vote via secret ballot to determine the five nominees for the award.

The following is a list of the films submitted by Cuba in the Best Foreign Language Film category at the Academy Awards. All films were produced in Spanish.

Cuba's first submission was directed by Miguel Littin, a leftist Chilean director who was nominated in this category twice, representing Mexico in 1975/76 (for Letters from Marusia) and Nicaragua in 1982/83 (for Alsino and the Condor). He also represented his native Chile in 2009.

In addition to the above films, the Dominican Republic submitted Guaguasi - a drama directed by a Cuban-American exile, set amidst the turmoil of the 1956 Cuban Revolution and filmed in the Dominican Republic - for consideration in 1983,

Notes

References
IMDB
Variety

Best Foreign Language Film Academy Award submissions by country
Academy Award for Best Foreign Language Film
Lists of films by country of production
Academy Award